Vera Arkadevna Michurina-Samoilova (1866–1948) was a Russian and Soviet actress of Saint Petersburg / Leningrad. She was a People's Artist of the USSR.

Michurina-Samoilova was born  in Saint Petersburg, into the Samoilov theatre family.

Michurina-Samoilova debuted on stage in 1886. She often appeared at the Alexandrinsky Theatre. Among her notable roles were Reneve in Light Without Heat (by Alexander Ostrovsky and Nikolai Solovyov), Natalia Petrovna in Turgenev's A Month in the Country, Ranevskaia in Chekhov's The Cherry Orchard, and Lady Milford in Schiller's Intrigue and Love.

The 1917 October Revolution and the establishment of the Soviet state occurred when Michurina-Samoilova was just over 50. Her notable roles in Soviet Russia included Zvezdintseva in Tolstoy's The Fruits of Enlightenment, Khlestova in Griboyedov's Woe From Wit, Polina Bardina in Gorky's Enemies, and Gurmyzhskaia in Ostrovsky's The Forest.

During the Siege of Leningrad, Michurina-Samoilova remained in the city; she was 75 by then and her health did not permit her to be evacuated. During the siege she participated in the cultural resistance, performing in the readings and plays of the Microphone Theatre. She published a memoir, Sixty Years in the Arts in 1949, including her description of the siege.

Michurina-Samoilova died in Leningrad on 2 November 1948.

Awards
Michurina-Samoilova was made a People's Artist of the Soviet Union in 1939, was awarded the USSR State Prize in 1943, and was awarded the Order of Lenin.

She is memorialized by a plaque at 2 Rossi Street, where she lived and worked, and where she died.

References

1866 births
1948 deaths
People's Artists of the USSR
Recipients of the Order of Lenin
Recipients of the USSR State Prize
Actresses from the Russian Empire
19th-century actresses from the Russian Empire
Russian stage actresses
20th-century Russian actresses
Actresses from Saint Petersburg
Burials at Tikhvin Cemetery